The payara, Hydrolycus scomberoides, is a species of dogtooth tetra. This predatory fish is found in the Amazon Basin in tropical South America. It was the first of four species to be described in the genus Hydrolycus.

Description
The most noticeable feature of H. scomberoides is the two long fangs protruding from its lower jaw. These are used to impale their prey, mostly smaller fish.

H. scomberoides is overall silvery with a dark spot behind the opercle and another at the lower base of the pectoral fin. In adults the tail is dusky on the basal half, turning paler (more transparent) towards the tip.

In the aquarium 
The payara, which is also sold as the saber tooth barracuda, vampire fish, vampire tetra, or saber tusk barracuda, is a popular species for large, aggressive aquariums. It requires a large aquarium and can only be mixed with relatively large species, as smaller will be seen as potential prey.

References

Cynodontidae
Sport fish
Fish of the Amazon basin
Freshwater fish of Brazil
Freshwater fish of Colombia
Fish described in 1819
Taxa named by Georges Cuvier